Amanda Mariah Stuck (born December 16, 1982) is an American politician.  A Democrat, she was a member of the Wisconsin State Assembly from 2015 to 2021, and was an unsuccessful candidate for United States House of Representatives in 2020.

Early life and education
Stuck was born on December 16, 1982 in Appleton, Wisconsin and attended Appleton North High School. She received her Bachelor of Arts degree in Political Science and Master of Public Administration from the University of Wisconsin–Oshkosh.

Career 
Stuck was a rural mail carrier and worked at the Appleton Housing Authority. She was also an aide to former Congressman Steve Kagen.

On November 4, 2014, Stuck was elected to the Wisconsin State Assembly as a Democrat, succeeding Penny Bernard Schaber. In 2016 and 2018 Stuck ran unopposed for re-election.

In July 2019, Stuck announced her intentions to run for Wisconsin's 8th congressional district against Mike Gallagher in the 2020 election. Stuck won the Democratic primary, but lost to Gallagher in the November general election.

Personal life 
Stuck is married and has two children.

References

External links

 Government website
 Campaign website

1982 births
21st-century American politicians
21st-century American women politicians
Living people
Democratic Party members of the Wisconsin State Assembly
Politicians from Appleton, Wisconsin
University of Wisconsin–Oshkosh alumni
Women state legislators in Wisconsin
Candidates in the 2020 United States elections